Acheiropodia (ACHP) is an autosomal-recessive disorder that results in hemimelia, a lack of formation of the distal extremities.

This is a congenital defect that consists of bilateral amputations of the distal upper and lower extremities, as well as aplasia of the hands and feet. Specifically, individuals with acheiropody are born with complete amputation of the distal humeral epiphysis and tibial diaphysis, as well as aplasia of the radius, ulna, fibula, and all hand and foot bones. It was first discovered and is prevalent almost exclusively in Brazil.

Genetics

ACHP has been associated with a mutation in the LMBR1 gene. The disorder is inherited in an autosomal-recessive manner. This means the defective gene responsible for the disorder is located on an autosome, and two copies of the defective gene (one inherited from each parent) are required to be born with the disorder. The parents of an individual with an autosomal recessive disorder both carry one copy of the defective gene, but usually do not experience any signs or symptoms of the disorder.

Diagnosis

References

External links 
 Overview at Orphanet
 PDF of Am. J. of Human Genetics article

Congenital disorders of musculoskeletal system
Autosomal recessive disorders
Rare diseases
Congenital amputations
Syndromes